This is a list of cider brands. Cider is an alcoholic beverage made exclusively from the juice of apple or pear. This list also includes perry, which is a similar alcoholic beverage made from pear varieties.

Operational brands

Defunct brands
 Martinelli's formerly produced a hard cider, now only produces sparkling apple juice, California, USA
 Red Rock Cider, now defunct brand made by Taunton Cider, division of Blackthorn Cider, United Kingdom
 White Lightning, discontinued at the end of 2009

See also
 List of cider and perry producers in the United Kingdom

References

Cider
Cider
Cider
Brands of cider